Lauri Sommer (born Lauri Soomere, 2 April 1973 in Viljandi) is an Estonian writer, literary scholar, translator and musician.

In the 1990s, he was a member of literary group Erakkond.

In 2004, he published the music album "Piimaš".

In 2021, he was awarded with Order of the White Star, V class.

Works
 1998: poetry collection "Laurila"
 2001: poetry collection "Raagraamis poiss" ('A Boy in Twigframe')
 2004: poetry collection "Nõidade õrnus" ('Tenderness of Enchanters')

References

Living people
1973 births
Estonian translators
Estonian male poets
20th-century Estonian writers
21st-century Estonian writers
Estonian musicians
Recipients of the Order of the White Star, 5th Class
University of Tartu alumni
People from Viljandi